Mirazizbek Mirzakhalilov (born 27 February 1995) is an Uzbek professional boxer. As an amateur, he won a gold medal at the 2019 World Championships, 2019 Asian Championships, and 2018 Asian Games.

Amateur career

Olympic result
Tokyo 2020
Round of 16: Defeated by Kurt Walker (Republic of Ireland) 4–1

World Championships result
Yekaterinburg 2019
Round of 32: Defeated Douglas de Andrade (Brazil) 5–0
Round of 16: Defeated Mohamed Hamout (Morocco) 4–1
Quarter-finals: Defeated Kairat Yeraliyev (Kazakhstan) 4–1
Semi-final: Defeated Erdenebatyn Tsendbaatar (Mongolia) 5–0
Final: Defeated Lázaro Álvarez (Cuba) 3–2

Belgrade 2021
Round of 32: Defeated by Jahmal Harvey (United States) 3–2

Asian Games result
Jakarta-Palembang 2018
Round of 16: Defeated Mohammad Al-Wadi (Jordan) 5–0
Quarter-finals: Defeated Kharkhüügiin Enkh-Amar (Mongolia) 3–2
Semi-finals: Defeated Sunan Agung Amoragam (Indonesia) 5–0
Final: Defeated Jo Hyo-nam (North Korea) RSCI

Professional career

Early career
Mirzakhalilov made his professional debut on 3 April 2021 in a bout against Tasha Mjuaji. Mirzakhalilov knocked his opponent down twice on route to a knockout win in the opening round.

Professional boxing record

References

External links

1995 births
Living people
Uzbekistani male boxers
People from Fergana
Featherweight boxers
AIBA World Boxing Championships medalists
World featherweight boxing champions
Boxers at the 2018 Asian Games
Asian Games gold medalists for Uzbekistan
Asian Games medalists in boxing
Medalists at the 2018 Asian Games
Boxers at the 2020 Summer Olympics
Olympic boxers of Uzbekistan
21st-century Uzbekistani people